"J.A.R." is a song by the American rock band Green Day. The song was a previously unreleased track from the Dookie sessions but it was later featured on the soundtrack to the movie Angus in 1995. 
In August 1995, the song reached number one on the Billboard Modern Rock Tracks chart and spent 16 weeks on it. The song peaked at number 22 on the Hot 100 Airplay chart. The song was featured as the eighth track on Green Day's 2001 greatest hits collection International Superhits!, and on their 2011 live album Awesome as Fuck.

Background
The acronym stands for 'Jason Andrew Relva', a childhood friend of Green Day bassist Mike Dirnt. Jason Relva was born on November 16, 1972, and died at the age of 19 on April 18, 1992, as the result of injuries sustained from a car accident. Mike Dirnt wrote the song in remembrance of him.

Jason Relva is thanked in the liner notes of 1,039/Smoothed Out Slappy Hours and Kerplunk.

Track listing

Vinyl Box Set

Chart positions

Reception
PopMatters listed "J.A.R." as the ninth best Green Day song, commenting "It's a winner in its own right, and in a sense, its bubbling bass, buzzing chord crashes, and Tre Cool's killer chorus drum beat is the Platonic ideal of a Green Day song."

Both Mark Hoppus of blink-182 and Chris DeMakes of Less Than Jake rated "J.A.R." as their favorite Green Day song. Hoppus stated that the opening guitar riff of the blink-182 song "What's My Age Again?" was created by him trying and failing to play the opening bass riff of "J.A.R." on his guitar.

References

1995 singles
Green Day songs
Songs written by Mike Dirnt
Song recordings produced by Rob Cavallo
Commemoration songs